The women's 400 metres hurdles event at the 1999 All-Africa Games was held 14–15 September 1999 at the Johannesburg Stadium.

Medalists

Results

Heats
Qualification: First 3 of each heat (Q) and the next 2 fastest (q) qualified for the final.

Final

References

400